The Freetown Secondary School for Girls also known as FSSG or the Osora School is a secondary school established by Maise Osora and Hannah Benka-Coker in 1926 in Freetown, Sierra Leone.

Sources
https://www.oocities.org/thetropics/cabana/7690/freetown.html

Schools in Freetown
Secondary schools in Sierra Leone
Educational institutions established in 1926
Girls' schools in Sierra Leone
1926 establishments in Sierra Leone